The 2008 NCAA Division I Men's Swimming and Diving Championships were contested in March 2008 at the Weyerhaeuser Aquatic Center in Federal Way, Washington at the 85th annual NCAA-sanctioned swim meet to determine the team and individual national champions of Division I men's collegiate swimming and diving in the United States.

Arizona topped the team standings, finishing 94 points ahead of Texas. It was the Wildcats' first team national title.

Team standings
Note: Top 10 only
(H) = Hosts
(DC) = Defending champions
Full results

See also
List of college swimming and diving teams

References

NCAA Division I Men's Swimming and Diving Championships
NCAA Division I Swimming And Diving Championships
NCAA Division I Men's Swimming And Diving Championships
NCAA Division I Men's Swimming and Diving Championships